Early presidential elections were held in the Republic of Montenegro on 9 February 2003, after the December 2002 elections had been declared invalid due to insufficient voter turnout.

Background
The low turnout was caused by a boycott by the major opposition parties, voters being disillusioned with politics, and poor weather conditions on polling day which resulted in 80 polling stations in mountainous areas being closed due to snow.

Results
Although Dragan Hajduković was a member of the Greens of Montenegro, he ran as an independent.

Aftermath
Although Filip Vujanović won the election with 85% of the vote, turnout was less than the required 50%, so the election was declared invalid. Fresh elections were called for May 2003, when the turnout rule was abolished.

References

2003 02
Montenegro
President
2003 02
Montenegro